Michael Habryka (born 6 April 1982) is a German retired professional footballer who played as a midfielder. He also holds Slovakian citizenship. He spent three seasons in the Bundesliga with VfL Wolfsburg.

References

1982 births
Living people
German footballers
Association football midfielders
Bundesliga players
VfL Wolfsburg players
VfL Wolfsburg II players
1. FC Magdeburg players
SV Werder Bremen II players
TSV Havelse players